"Willie the Pimp" is a song from Frank Zappa's 1969 album Hot Rats. It features an idiosyncratic Captain Beefheart vocal and one of Zappa's classic guitar solos. It is the only track that is not instrumental on the album, though the track features a long guitar solo.

The song appeared as an instrumental on Zappa's Fillmore East – June 1971, originally split as the last track on side one (2'50") and continued on the first track on side two (1:54) of the LP. Another short version from the 1984 tour appeared on You Can't Do That on Stage Anymore, Vol. 4 as a 2'06" segue between "My Guitar Wants To Kill Your Mama" and "Montana".

The album title Hot Rats comes from a lyric of Willie the Pimp. The origin of the song was explained in a conversation Zappa recorded in 1969. This interview recording was later released as "The Story of Willie the Pimp" on the Zappa album Mystery Disc.

The song was ranked number 75 on the list of "The 100 Greatest Guitar Songs of All Time" of Rolling Stone.

Musicians

Hot Rats version
Frank Zappa - guitar, percussion
Ian Underwood - keyboards
Captain Beefheart - vocal
Sugarcane Harris - violin
John Guerin - drums
Max Bennett - bass

Fillmore East
Frank Zappa - guitar & dialogue
Mark Volman - lead vocals & dialogue
Howard Kaylan - lead vocals & dialogue
Ian Underwood - winds & keyboard & vocals
Aynsley Dunbar - drums
Jim Pons - bass & vocals & dialogue
Bob Harris - 2nd keyboard & vocals

You Can't Do That on Stage Anymore, Vol. 4
Frank Zappa - lead guitar/vocal
Ike Willis - guitar/vocal
Ray White - guitar/vocal
Bobby Martin - keyboards/sax/vocal
Allan Zavod - keyboards
Scott Thunes - bass
Chad Wackerman - drums

Cover versions
Juicy Lucy covered "Willie the Pimp" on their 1970 release Lie Back and Enjoy It, their version was included in Andy Votel's compilation Vertigo Mixed, released in 2005.
Aynsley Dunbar recorded a 14'55" version with his band Blue Whale in 1971. Dunbar was the drummer for Frank Zappa and the Mothers of Invention at the time the album was released. 
Stack Waddy on their 1972 album Bugger Off!.

References

1969 songs
Frank Zappa songs
Blues rock songs
Captain Beefheart songs
Songs about procurers
Songs about prostitutes
Songs written by Frank Zappa
Song recordings produced by Frank Zappa
Fictional pimps